The Reserve Infantry Division of Guizhou Provincial Military District() is a reserve infantry formation of the People's Liberation Army.

The activation of the 8th  Reserve Division of Kunming Military Region() started on May 1, 1983, in Xingyi, Guizhou. The division was composed of the 22nd, 23rd, and 24th regiments and an artillery regiment.

The division was formally activated in August-September 1984 when it was redesignated as the Reserve Division of Xingyi. By then the division was then composed of:
1st Regiment
2nd Regiment
3rd Regiment
Artillery Regiment

In 1999 the division was then redesignated as the Reserve Infantry Division of Guizhou Provincial Military District. 

From 2005 the division was composed of:
1st Regiment - Zunyi, Guizhou
2nd Regiment - Duyun, Guizhou
3rd Regiment - Anshun, Guizhou
Artillery Regiment - Xingyi, Guizhou
Anti-Aircraft Artillery Regiment - Anshun, Guizhou

References

Reserve divisions of the People's Liberation Army
Military units and formations established in 1984